The BODE index, for Body-mass index, airflow Obstruction, Dyspnea, and Exercise, is a multidimensional scoring system and capacity index used to test patients who have been diagnosed with chronic obstructive pulmonary disease (COPD) and to predict long-term outcomes for them. The index uses the four factors to predict risk of death from the disease.

The BODE index will result in a score of zero to ten dependent upon FEV1 or "forced expiratory volume in one second" (the greatest volume of air that can be breathed out in the first second of a breath), body-mass index, the distance walked in six minutes, and the modified MRC dyspnea scale. Significant weight loss is a bad sign. Results of spirometry are also good predictors of the future progress of the disease, but they are not as good as the test results of the BODE index.

References

Further reading 

 
 

Chronic lower respiratory diseases